The 1988 U.S. Men's Clay Court Championships was a Grand Prix men's tennis tournament held in Charleston, South Carolina in the United States. It was the 20th edition of the tournament and was held on outdoor clay courts from April 25 through May 2, 1988. First-seeded Andre Agassi won the singles title.

Finals

Singles

 Andre Agassi defeated  Jimmy Arias 6–2, 6–2
 It was Agassi's 2nd singles title of the year and the 3rd of his career.

Doubles

 Pieter Aldrich /  Danie Visser defeated  Jorge Lozano /  Todd Witsken 7–6, 6–3
 It was Aldrich's only title of the year and the 1st of his career. It was Visser's only title of the year and the 3rd of his career.

References

External links 
 ITF tournament edition details

 
U.S. Men's Clay Court Championships
U.S. Men's Clay Court Championships
U.S. Men's Clay Court Championships
U.S. Men's Clay Court Championships
U.S. Men's Clay Court Championships